Drocourt is the name of several communes in France:

Drocourt, Pas-de-Calais 
Drocourt, Yvelines